Gli amici di Gesù - Giuda is a 2001 Italian-German coproduction television movie produced by Raffaele Mertes. It was included in the Turner Bible Collection series as Close to Jesus - Judas. The cast includes Enrico Lo Verso as Judas Iscariot, Danny Quinn as Jesus, and Mathieu Carrière as Pontius Pilate.

References

2001 films